Alexei Yegorovich Badayev (– 3 November 1951) was a Soviet politician, functionary and a nominal head of state of the Russian Soviet Federative Socialist Republic during the leadership of Joseph Stalin.

Biography
Badayev was born at Yuryevo in the Oryol Governorate of the Russian Empire in 1883. He joined the Bolshevik faction of the Russian Social Democratic Labour Party in 1904, and was an active member of the Metal Workers' Union from its inception in 1906.

From 1912 to 1914 he was a Deputy of the Fourth State Duma. In 1912-13, he also worked on the Bolshevik newspaper Pravda. In 1914, along with the other members of the Bolshevik group in the Fourth Duma (apart from the double agent Roman Malinovsky), and was deported the following year to Turkestan. He later wrote reminiscences of this period which were translated into English as The Bolsheviks in the Tsarist Duma.

Badayev returned to Petrograd after the February Revolution in 1917 and became actively involved in the city duma, and in the management of food distribution. After the Bolshevik Revolution he was appointed chairman of the Food Commissariat for the North West region of Russia.

In September 1919 Petrograd consumer commune (shortly Petrocommune) was established by Decree of the Sovnarkom "On consumer communities" dated 16 March 1919. It was the germ of the cooperative sector during the "war communism". Badayev was the founding chairman of the Petrocommune governance.

In the first half of the 1920s he worked as Deputy Chairman of the Petrograd (later the city was renamed Leningrad) gubispolkom (ispolkom of gubernija). He was a member of the Central Committee of the All-Union Communist Party from 1925 to 1951 - one of only a handful of members of that body to survive the Great Purge. He was Chairman of the USSR Central Consumers' Union (Tsentrosoyuz), 1930-38. From August 1937 to July 1938 he was the People's Commissar of Food Industry of the RSFSR, and from 19 July 1938 to 4 March 1944 he was the Chairman of the Presidium of the Supreme Soviet of the Russian SFSR. He died in Moscow in 1951.

See also
Badayev warehouses

References

1883 births
1951 deaths
People from Oryol Oblast
People from Oryol Governorate
Russian Social Democratic Labour Party members
Stalinism
Anti-revisionists
Old Bolsheviks
Central Committee of the Communist Party of the Soviet Union members
Members of the 4th State Duma of the Russian Empire
Russian Constituent Assembly members
Central Executive Committee of the Soviet Union members
First convocation members of the Soviet of the Union
Second convocation members of the Soviet of the Union
Heads of state of the Russian Soviet Federative Socialist Republic
People's commissars and ministers of the Russian Soviet Federative Socialist Republic
All-Russian Central Executive Committee members
Members of the Supreme Soviet of the Russian Soviet Federative Socialist Republic, 1938–1947
Recipients of the Order of Lenin
Recipients of the Order of the Red Banner of Labour
Burials at Novodevichy Cemetery